The Highland-Camrose Bungalow Village is a grouping of Craftsman style bungalows located at the northwest corner of Highland and Camrose Avenues in Hollywood, Los Angeles, California. The bungalows were designed by the Taylor Brothers and Lee Campbell as residences. The bungalows were later converted to offices, which are occupied by various organizations affiliated with the nearby Hollywood Bowl, including the Los Angeles Philharmonic Orchestra. 

In 1989, the bungalow village was added to the National Register of Historic Places.

The listing included 16 contributing buildings, a contributing structure (stone walls), and a contributing site (landscaping).

See also
 Los Angeles Historic-Cultural Monuments in Hollywood
 List of Registered Historic Places in Los Angeles
 Hollywood Heights, Los Angeles

References

Historic districts in Los Angeles
Houses on the National Register of Historic Places in Los Angeles
Residential buildings in Los Angeles
Hollywood Hills
Historic districts on the National Register of Historic Places in California